Colin Wilson (born June 13, 1961) is an American film producer, executive producer, and unit production manager. He is best known for producing the films Casper (1995), The Lost World: Jurassic Park (1997), Amistad (1997), Lara Croft: Tomb Raider (2001), Terminator 3: Rise of the Machines (2003), Troy (2004), War of the Worlds (2005), Munich (2005), John Carter (2012), and The Meg (2018).

Wilson began his career as an assistant editor, working on the first three installments of the Superman film series (1978–1983). He also executive produced the films Avatar (2009), Zero Dark Thirty (2012), and Suicide Squad (2016), as well as the series The Mandalorian (2019–2020), which earned him a nomination for the Primetime Emmy Award for Outstanding Drama Series.

Filmography
He was a producer in all films unless otherwise noted.

Film

Editorial department

Production manager

Miscellaneous crew

Thanks

Television

Production manager

Thanks

References

External links

American film producers
Living people
Place of birth missing (living people)
1957 births
Unit production managers